Consolidated Theatres is a Hawaii-based movie theater chain. It operates 9 locations in the state, and is one of two major cinema chains in Hawaii, with the other being Regal Cinemas. It screens first-run feature films, as well as some art house independent films and films from Asia.

It is one of the affiliated cinema chains operated under Reading International.

Locations
Consolidated operates 9 locations in Hawaii, with eight on the Oahu island, and one on the Maui island. Some theaters, such as Consolidated Pearlridge and Kapolei will also screen major films from Asian countries, notably the Philippines, South Korea and Mainland China. Consolidated Kahala is an arthouse theater, it screens specialized and indie films. The chain opened a dine-in "luxury" cinema known as Ōlino in October 2016.

Oahu island
Consolidated Ward
Olino by Consolidated
Consolidated Mililani
Consolidated Koko Marina
Consolidated Kahala
Consolidated Pearlridge
Consolidated Kapolei
Consolidated Koʻolau

Maui island
Consolidated Kaʻahumanu

Features 
Consolidated offers Reading Cinemas' "Titan" premium large formats, including Titan XC ("Extreme Cinema") with a 35-foot screen with Dolby 7.1 surround sound and XpanD 3D, and Titan Luxe with Dolby Atmos.

In an homage to the culture of Hawaii, the chain's pre-film intro sequence features a recording of a Hula kahiko performance. In December 2017, coinciding with the premiere of Star Wars: The Last Jedi, Consolidated introduced a digitally remastered version of the sequence to commemorate the company's centennial.

References

External links
Official website

Movie theatre chains in the United States
Theatres in Hawaii
Cinema of Hawaii